Luboml may refer to:
 Liuboml, a city in Ukraine
 Luboml: My Heart Remembers, a documentary